Darker/Cut is a compilation album by C-Tec, released on 5 September 2018 by Armalyte Industries.

Reception 
Flux awarded Darker/Cut a nine out of ten and said "every track has a story and a meaning, and we have no fillers or dull moments" and that the album represents "an important page in the history of electronic music, showing different facets and graced by great artists." Regen said Darker "has  De Meyer's vocals, which are a hallmark of '80s era industrial, as well as Heal's own chainsaw of a voice, and blasts of heavily processed guitars" and "felt more experimental than the next album, Cut, which seems to shift musical styles more, as well as a greater employment of empty space throughout the album."

Track listing

Personnel 
Adapted from the Darker/Cut liner notes.

Cyber-Tec Project
 Jean-Luc de Meyer – vocals
 Ged Denton – keyboards (1.1-1.10), synthesizer (2.1-2.10)
 Marc Heal – additional vocals, production, keyboards (1.1-1.10), synthesizer (2.1-2.10)

'Additional performers
 Phil Barry – sampler (1.1-1.10)
 Julian Beeston – drums and additional synthesizer (2.1-2.10)
 David Bianchi – guitar (2.1-2.10)
 Rhys Fulber – sampler and additional production (1.1-1.10)
 Björn Jünemann – sampler (1.1-1.10)
 Doug Martin – synthesizer, additional guitar and engineering (2.1-2.10)
 Daniel Myer – sampler (1.1-1.10)
 Dejan Samardzic – sampler (1.1-1.10)

Production and design
 Jim Marcus – cover art, design
 Jules Seifert – remastering

Release history

References

External links 
 Darker/Cut at Discogs (list of releases)
 Darker/Cut at Bandcamp

2018 compilation albums
C-Tec albums